Hemistomia shostakovichi is a species of minute freshwater snail with an operculum, an aquatic gastropod mollusc or micromollusc in the family Tateidae.  This species is endemic to New Caledonia, where it is only known from one small seepage behind a micro-dam in a dry valley near Voh.

See also
List of non-marine molluscs of New Caledonia

References

Hemistomia
Endemic fauna of New Caledonia
Gastropods described in 1998
Freshwater molluscs of Oceania